Vrtijeljka is a hill near Cetinje, in Montenegro, with the height of 871 m. It is located between the villages of Lipa and Pejakovići. It was the site of a battle between Bajo Pivljanin's band and advancing Ottoman forces of Suleiman, Pasha of Scutari, in 1685.

Currently, there is an unsanitary landfill below the hill, in use since 1987.

References

Cetinje
Hills of Montenegro